Bruno Jose Zandonadi (May 1, 1981 – October 13, 2012) was a Brazilian footballer that played for Persikota Tangerang in the Liga Indonesia Premier Division. In the 2008-09 season, he played for Indonesia Super League club Persiba Balikpapan with one goal scored. He also played for another Tangerang football club Persita Tangerang and another premier division team PSIS Semarang.

Zandonadi died in Tangerang in October 2012 from the cytomegalovirus, eight weeks before the death of Diego Mendieta.

References

1981 births
2012 deaths
Association football midfielders
Brazilian expatriate footballers
Brazilian expatriate sportspeople in Indonesia
Brazilian footballers
Expatriate footballers in Indonesia
Liga 1 (Indonesia) players
Indonesian Premier Division players
Persikota Tangerang players
Persita Tangerang players
Persiba Balikpapan players
PSIS Semarang players
Infectious disease deaths in Indonesia
Footballers from Brasília